"Whiskey, If You Were a Woman" is a song written by Mary W. Francis, Johnny MacRae and Bob Morrison, and recorded by American country music band Highway 101.  It was released in May 1987 as the second single from the band's self-titled debut album.

The song spent 23 weeks on the U.S. Hot Country Singles charts, peaking at number 2. In Canada, it reached Number One on the country music charts published by RPM.

Charts

Weekly charts

Year-end charts

References

1987 singles
Highway 101 songs
Song recordings produced by Paul Worley
Warner Records singles
1987 songs
Songs written by Johnny MacRae
Songs written by Bob Morrison (songwriter)